Oxbow virus (OXBV) is a single-stranded, enveloped, negative-sense RNA orthohantavirus.

Natural reservoir 
Oxbow virus was isolated from an American shrew mole (Neurotrichus gibbsii), captured in Gresham, Oregon, in September 2003.

Virology 
The genome of the Oxbow virus along the full length of the S, M, and partial L-segment nucleotide and amino acid sequences show a low sequence similarity to rodent-borne hantaviruses. Phylogenetic analysis demonstrated that Oxbow virus and Asama virus are related to soricine shrew-borne hantaviruses found in North America, Europe, and Asia. This suggests both these viruses evolved with cross-species transmission.

See also 
 Hantavirus pulmonary syndrome
 Hantavirus hemorrhagic fever with renal syndrome
 Cross-species transmission

References

External links 
 CDC's Hantavirus Technical Information Index page
 Viralzone: Hantavirus
 Virus Pathogen Database and Analysis Resource (ViPR): Hantaviridae
 Occurrences and deaths in North and South America

Hantaviridae
Zoonoses